William Marvin Howe (24 February 1906 – 17 July 1996) was a Progressive Conservative party member of the House of Commons of Canada. He was born in Palmerston, Ontario and became a merchant by career.

Marvin Howe was first elected at the Wellington—Huron riding in the 1953 general election, then re-elected there in 1957, 1958, 1962, 1963 and 1965. In the 1968 federal election, Howe was re-elected at the newly configured Wellington—Grey riding. In 1972, after completing his term in the 28th Canadian Parliament, Howe left federal office and did not seek re-election to the House of Commons.

External links
 
 Parliament of Canada: History of Federal Ridings since 1867

1906 births
1996 deaths
Members of the House of Commons of Canada from Ontario
Progressive Conservative Party of Canada MPs